East Africa Protectorate (also known as British East Africa) was an area in the African Great Lakes occupying roughly the same terrain as present-day Kenya from the Indian Ocean inland to the border with Uganda in the west. Controlled by Britain in the late 19th century, it grew out of British commercial interests in the area in the 1880s and remained a protectorate until 1920 when it became the Colony of Kenya, save for an independent  coastal strip that became the Kenya Protectorate.

Administration

European missionaries began settling in the area from Mombasa to Mount Kilimanjaro in the 1840s, nominally under the protection of the Sultanate of Zanzibar. In 1886, the British government encouraged William Mackinnon, who already had an agreement with the Sultan and whose shipping company traded extensively in the African Great Lakes, to establish British influence in the region. He formed a British East Africa Association which led to the Imperial British East Africa Company being chartered in 1888 and given the original grant to administer the dependency. The British "sphere of influence", agreed at the Berlin Conference of 1885, extended up the coast and inland across the future Kenya. Mombasa was the administrative centre at this time.

However, the company began to fail, and on 1 July 1895, the British government proclaimed a protectorate, the administration being transferred to the Foreign Office. In 1902, administration was again transferred to the Colonial Office. In 1897 Hugh Cholmondeley, the pioneer of white settlement, arrived in the Kenya highlands, which was then part of the Protectorate. Lord Delamere was impressed by the agricultural possibilities of the area. In 1902, the boundaries of the Protectorate were extended to include what was previously the Eastern Province of Uganda. Lord Delamere now commenced extensive farming operations, and in 1905, when a large number of new settlers arrived from England and South Africa, the Protectorate was transferred from the authority of the Foreign Office to that of the Colonial Office. The capital was shifted from Mombasa to Nairobi in 1905. A regular Government and Legislature were constituted by Order in Council in 1906. This constituted the administrator a governor and provided for legislative and executive councils. Lieutenant Colonel J. Hayes Sadler was the first governor and commander in chief. There were occasional troubles with local tribes but the country was opened up by the Government and the colonists with little bloodshed. After the First World War, more farmers arrived from England and South Africa, and by 1919 the European population was estimated at 9,000 settlers.

On 23 July 1920, the inland areas of the Protectorate were annexed as British dominions by Order in Council. That part of the former Protectorate was thereby constituted as the Colony of Kenya. The remaining  coastal strip (with the exception of Witu), remained a Protectorate under an agreement with the Sultan of Zanzibar. That coastal strip, remaining under the sovereignty of the Sultan of Zanzibar, was constituted as the Protectorate of Kenya in 1920. The East Africa Protectorate was bounded to the north by the Ethiopian Empire and the Huwan, a semi-independent vassal state of the Ethiopian Empire; to the east by the Italian Geledi, to the south by German East Africa; to the west by the Uganda Protectorate.

Development
After 1896, Indian settlers came to the area as moneylenders, traders, and artisans. Racial segregation was normalised, with the Europeans assigning the Highlands to themselves. Other restrictions included commercial and residential segregation in the towns, and restrictions on Indian immigration. Nevertheless, the Indians rapidly grew to outnumber the Europeans by more than two to one by 1919. India was a crown colony whose citizens enjoyed certain privileges but it was unclear whether the Ishmael Indians in the African Great Lakes were to be recognised as citizens of the British Empire or as a subject race.

In 1903, Joseph Chamberlain, then serving as Secretary of State for the Colonies, offered  at Uasin Gishu in British East Africa to Zionist settlers as part of the Uganda Scheme. However, opposition to the scheme at the Sixth Zionist Congress led to the plan falling through and Chamberlain swiftly withdrew the offer. In April 1903, Major Frederick Russell Burnham, an American scout then serving as a director of the East African Syndicate, sent an expedition consisting of John Weston Brooke, John Charles Blick, Mr. Bittlebank and Mr. Brown, to assess the mineral wealth of the region. The party, known as the "Four B.'s", travelled from Nairobi via Mount Elgon northwards to the western shores of Lake Rudolf, experiencing plenty of privations from want of water, and of the danger from encounters with the Maasai. With the arrival in 1903 of hundreds of prospective settlers, chiefly from South Africa, questions were raised concerning the preservation for the Maasai of their rights of pasturage, and the decision was made to entertain no more applications for large areas of land.

In the process of carrying out this policy of colonisation a dispute arose between Sir Charles Eliot,  Commissioner of British East Africa, and Lord Lansdowne, the British Foreign Secretary. Lansdowne, believing himself bound by the pledges, decided the applications should be approved. In a separate matter, two South African applicants who were each attempting to lease  were declined by  Lansdowne, and he refused Eliot permission to conclude the transactions. In view of this Eliot resigned his post, giving his reason in a public telegram to the Prime Minister, dated Mombasa, 21 June 1904, stating: "Lord Lansdowne ordered me to refuse grants of land to certain private persons while giving a monopoly of land on unduly advantageous terms to the East Africa Syndicate. I have refused to execute these instructions, which I consider unjust and impolitic." Sir Donald William Stewart, the chief commissioner of Ashanti (Ghana), was announced as Sir Charles' successor on the day the telegram was sent.

Legislation
In 1914, the British government banned cannabis ("bhang") in the Protectorate.

Stamps and postal history of British East Africa

The territory had its own mail system during the 1890s.

See also
 Charles Eliot
 List of colonial governors and administrators of Kenya
 East African campaign (World War I)
 History of Kenya
 Analysis of Western European colonialism and colonization

References

Notes

Further reading 
 Beck, Ann. "Colonial Policy and Education in British East Africa, 1900–1950". Journal of British Studies, vol. 5, no. 2, 1966, pp. 115–138. online
 Furley, O. W. "Education and the Chiefs in East Africa in the inter-war period." Transafrican Journal of History 1.1 (1971): 60–83.
 John S. Galbraith,  Mackinnon and East Africa 1878–1895 (Cambridge 1972)
 Gregory, John Walter. The Foundation of British East Africa (London: H. Marshall, 1901) online.
 Aim25.ac.uk: Sir William Mackinnon 
 Savage, Donald C., and J. Forbes Munro. "Carrier Corps Recruitment in the British East Africa Protectorate 1914–1918." Journal of African History 7.2 (1966): 313–342.
 Whitehead, Clive. "The historiography of British imperial education policy, Part II: Africa and the rest of the colonial empire." History of Education 34.4 (2005): 441–454.

External links

 Unimaps.com: 1901 Map of British East Africa Protectorate (Kenya)
 Purl.pt: A map of part of Eastern Africa, prepared by authority of the Imperial British East Africa Company (1889)

East Africa Protectorate
Former British colonies and protectorates in Africa
British Kenya
East Africa
History of Kenya
1890s in Kenya
1900s in Kenya
1910s in Kenya
States and territories established in 1895
States and territories disestablished in 1920
1895 establishments in Kenya
1920 disestablishments in Kenya
1895 establishments in the British Empire
1920 disestablishments in the British Empire
19th century in Kenya
20th century in Kenya
Former countries of the interwar period